Urania (minor planet designation: 30 Urania) is a large main-belt asteroid that was discovered by English astronomer John Russell Hind on July 22, 1854. It was his last asteroid discovery. This object is named after Urania, the Greek Muse of astronomy. Initial orbital elements for 30 Urania were published by Wilhelm Günther, an assistant at Breslau Observatory.

Based upon its spectrum, this is classified as a stony S-type asteroid. During 2000, speckle interferometry measurements from the Telescopio Nazionale Galileo in the Canary Islands were used to measure the apparent size and shape of 30 Urania. This gave cross-sectional dimensions equivalent to an ellipse with a length of 111 km and a width of 89 km, for a ratio of 0.80.

References

External links
 Keck image of Urania (Marchis 2011 November 11)
 
 

Background asteroids
Urania
Urania
S-type asteroids (Tholen)
Sl-type asteroids (SMASS)
18540722